Kensey Johns Jr. (December 10, 1791 – March 28, 1857) was an American lawyer and politician from Delaware. He was a member of the Federalist Party and later the Whig Party who served as U.S. Representative from Delaware.

Early life and family 
Johns was born in New Castle, Delaware, son of the prominent Delaware jurist and Chancellor Kensey Johns. Growing up he pursued classical studies and was graduated from Princeton College in 1810. He studied law with his uncle, Nicholas Van Dyke and at the Litchfield Law School, was admitted to the Delaware Bar in 1813 and commenced the practice of law in New Castle. His wife was Maria Johns and his mother was Nancy Ann Van Dyke Johns, the daughter of former Delaware President Nicholas Van Dyke. They were members of the Presbyterian Church at New Castle. He was a slaveholder.

Professional and political career 
Johns was elected to the 20th Congress to fill the vacancy caused by the appointment of Louis McLane to the U.S. Senate and McLane's consequent resignation. He was reelected to the 21st Congress and served from October 2, 1827, to March 3, 1831.

After the death of his father he was appointed to take his place as Chancellor of Delaware in 1832. He served in this capacity for 25 years, until his own death in 1857. He also served as Presiding Judge of the Orphan's Court and Court of Errors and Appeals.

Death and legacy 
Johns died unexpectedly while in office at New Castle and was buried there in the Presbyterian Cemetery.

He is said to have been "painstaking and laborious to a degree in his careful examination of questions, but was also notably prompt in making his decisions." He was known to have been a lawyer who would be "referring every case to some well-settled principle of law, rather than seeking to support it upon mere case authority. He not only laboriously, but conscientiously, sought to adjudge every case thus submitted, but also to draw upon therefrom well defined principles and rules of equity." Nevertheless, he was "notably prompt in making his decisions, seldom permitting the term to pass in making his determination."

Almanac 
Elections were held the first Tuesday of October. U.S. Representatives took office March 4 and have a two-year term.

Notes

References

Bibliography

External links

 Biographical Dictionary of the U.S. Congress
 Delaware's Members of Congress
 Find A Grave
 The Political Graveyard

1791 births
1857 deaths
Princeton University alumni
American people of Dutch descent
American Presbyterians
People from New Castle, Delaware
Delaware lawyers
Delaware Federalists
Delaware Whigs
19th-century American politicians
Members of the United States House of Representatives from Delaware
Chancellors of Delaware
Burials in New Castle County, Delaware
Delaware National Republicans
National Republican Party members of the United States House of Representatives
19th-century American judges
19th-century American lawyers